Madikwe Dam is an earth-fill type dam located on the Tholwane River, near Madikwe, North West, South Africa. It was established in 1976 and the dams primary purpose is to serve for municipal and industrial use. The hazard potential of the dam has been ranked high (3).

See also
List of reservoirs and dams in South Africa
List of rivers of South Africa

References 

 List of South African Dams from the Department of Water Affairs and Forestry (South Africa)

Dams in South Africa
Dams completed in 1976